2+1 may refer to:

In physics
 2+1 road
 2+1 dimensions
 2+1 dimensional gravity (String theory, Quantum gravity)

In music
 2 Plus 1, a Polish band